Hobbs is an unincorporated community in Madison Township, Tipton County, in the U.S. state of Indiana.

It is part of the Kokomo, Indiana, Metropolitan Statistical Area.

History
Hobbs was founded in 1878 by Henderson Hobbs. He built his farm just next to the Lake Erie & Western Railroad that ran through the area. A Christian church was founded in 1884. They converted an old school house turned blacksmith shop into a church in 1896. A new building was constructed in 1911. A Methodist Episcopal Church was founded in the community in 1909 after separating from the church in Windfall. As of 1914, Hobbs had a population of 200. During that time, mills for flour and wood were the primary economic drivers.

The post office at Hobbs has been in operation since 1876.

Geography

References

Footnotes

Sources
 Pershing, Marvin W. "History of Tipton County, Indiana: Her People, Industries and Institutions". Indianapolis: B.F. Bowen (1914).

Unincorporated communities in Tipton County, Indiana
Unincorporated communities in Indiana
Kokomo, Indiana metropolitan area